Henry L. Bachman (born April 29, 1930 in Brooklyn, New York) was the president of IEEE in 1987. He is a Fellow of the IEEE. He received the IEEE Haraden Pratt Award in 1995. He has served as Vice President of BAE Systems. He graduated from Brooklyn Technical High School and New York University Tandon School of Engineering obtaining the BSEE and MSEE degrees in 1951 and 1954, respectively. He attended the six-week Advanced Management Program at Harvard University School of Business in 1972.

References

Living people
Polytechnic Institute of New York University alumni
Presidents of the IEEE
American electrical engineers
Brooklyn Technical High School alumni
Engineers from New York (state)
1930 births